The 635 Group is a network of militant anti-fascists operating in West Yorkshire. Part of the Antifa movement of the 2000s, 635 Group was highly active in suppressing the British People's Party until its dissolution in 2013.

References 

Anti-fascist organisations in the United Kingdom
Far-left politics